Jared Bush (born June 12, 1974) is an American screenwriter, producer and director. He is best known for co-writing and co-directing the Walt Disney Animation Studios film Zootopia (2016), writing the film Moana (2016) and writing, directing and winning an Academy Award for Best Animated Feature for the film Encanto (2021) besides co-creating and executive producing the Disney XD animated series Penn Zero: Part-Time Hero.

Career 
Bush co-wrote the script of Walt Disney Animation Studios' Zootopia and also co-directed the film along with Byron Howard and Rich Moore. He joined the Zootopia project early on, before it evolved from a spy film into a police procedural; he was excited to work on a spy film because both his father and grandfather had worked for the Central Intelligence Agency.

He also wrote the screenplay of Walt Disney Animation Studios' Moana.

Bush co-created the animated television series Penn Zero: Part-Time Hero. In 2021, Bush directed Encanto about a Colombian magical family alongside Howard with Charise Castro Smith as co-director. Bush also co-wrote the screenplay alongside Castro Smith.

Filmography

Films

Television

Short films

Awards and nominations

References

External links 
 
 

Living people
American animators
American animated film directors
American animated film producers
Animation screenwriters
American television writers
Place of birth missing (living people)
American male screenwriters
Annie Award winners
Walt Disney Animation Studios people
1974 births
American male television writers
Directors of Best Animated Feature Academy Award winners
Disney Television Animation people